Carnforth is an unincorporated community in Poweshiek County, in the U.S. state of Iowa.

History
A post office was established as Manatt in 1884, and renamed Carnforth after two months. The Carnforth post office was discontinued in 1907. A railroad official selected the place name Carnforth from a book he was reading at the time. Carnforth's population was 33 in 1902, and 40 in 1925.

References

Unincorporated communities in Poweshiek County, Iowa
1884 establishments in Iowa
Unincorporated communities in Iowa